Eshmanan (corruption of Yajamaana Sanskrit leader) is a term used in Kerala (south India) to refer to a feudal landlord. The term means "lord" in Old Malayalam and referred to Chemb azhi nambi or (Chengazhi nambiar) Nambiars and other Samanthan Nair and Kiriyathil Nair caste members who occupied the position of rulers and chieftains. Some of the Nambiar landlords, such as Chengazhi Nambiar (Chengazinad Eshmanan) Kalliat Eshmanan and Koodali Eshmanan were among the largest landowners in pre-independence Kerala.
Other terms for a Nayar feudal landlord, included Nayanar (Nair subcaste).

See also
Mannadiar
Madampi
Pillai
Nayanar (Nair subcaste)

External links

Nair
 Eshm